Walter Weber may refer to:

 Walter A. Weber (1906–1979), American illustrator and naturalist
 Wally Weber (1903–1984), American football player and coach
 Walter Weber (cricketer) (1879–1941), Guyanese cricketer
 Walter Weber (engineer) (1907–1944), German audio engineer involved with tape bias research